Miss Europe 1984 was the 43rd edition of the Miss Europe pageant and the 32nd edition under the Mondial Events Organization. It was held in Badgastein, Austria on February 17, 1984. Neşe Erberk of Turkey, was crowned Miss Europe 1984 by out going titleholder Nazlı Deniz Kuruoğlu of Turkey.

Results

Placements

Special awards

Contestants 

 - Mercedes Stermitz
 - Françoise Bostoen
 - Katia Chrysochou
 - Tina-Lissette Dahl Jørgensen
 - Karen Lesley Moore
 - Sanna Marita Pekkala
 - Frédérique Leroy
 - Loana Katharina Radecki
 - Giselle Ruiz
 - Plousia "Sia" Farfaraki
 - Nancy Lalleman-Heijnis
 - Kristín Ingvadóttir
 - Patricia "Trish" Nolan
 - Ambra Pellino
 - Jennifer Schembri
 - Janne Knutsen
 - Lidia Wasiak
 - Anabela Elisa Vissenjou Ananíades
 - Linda Renton
 - Garbiñe Abásolo García
 - Viveca Miriam Ljung
 - Corinne Martin
 - Neşe Erberk
 - Lianne Patricia Gray
 - Jadranka Mitrovic

Notes

Returns

Withdrawals

"Comité Officiel et International Miss Europe" Competition

The competition took place at the El Dorado Fitness and Fun Centre in Vienna, Austria. There were 19 delegates all from their own countries. At the end, Trine Elisabeth Mørk of Norway was crowned as Miss Europa 1984.

Placements

Contestants

 - Michaela Nussbaumer
 - Maria Argyri Charalambous
 - Katrina Grebak
 - Vivien Stamp
 - Tarja Candelin
 - Louise Sophie Bertaux
 - Petra Geisler
 - Rosalie van Breemen
 - Rita Tóth (Tóth Rita)
 - Solveig Thorisdottir (Sólveig Þórisdóttir)
 - Beverley Keegan
 - Alessandra Barale
 - Jacqueline Cassar
 - Trine Elisabeth Mørk
 - Colette Dolan
 - Susana Alguacil
 - Susanna Marie Lundmark
 - Lea La Salle
 - Dinka Delić

References

External links 
 

Miss Europe
1984 beauty pageants
1984 in Austria